The United Nations University Institute for Water, Environment and Health (UNU-INWEH) is a United Nations (UN) agency responsible for acting as the UN’s "Think Tank on Water". The organization is a research and training institute of the United Nations University (UNU), the academic arm of the United Nations, with a mandate to address water security and access issues internationally. UNU-INWEH was created in 1996 in response to an emerging concern about the growing global water crisis and its harmful impact on human and environmental health and sustainable development. 

UNU-INWEH has made major contributions to advancing global policy-relevant water research. UNU-INWEH represents the UNU at UN-Water — an inter-agency coordination mechanism of the United Nations for freshwater and sanitation-related issues. The institute leads UN-Water efforts to support the UN-wide International Decade for Action on “Water for Sustainable Development” (2018–2028).

UNU-INWEH is based in Hamilton, Ontario and operates out of the McMaster Innovation Park. Vladimir Smakhtin is the current Director of the institute.

Structure 
UNU-INWEH is hosted under the parent organization of the United Nations University headquartered in Tokyo. As a UNU institute, UNU-INWEH is managed by the institute's Director who reports to the UNU Rector, an Under-Secretary-General of the UN. The organization is governed by the UNU Council, reporting annually to the UN General Assembly, the UN Economic and Social Council, and the Executive Board of UNESCO. The guidelines for the management of the institute are set by an International Advisory Council (IAC) of environmental scientists and policy experts, appointed by the UNU Rector in consultation with the UNU Council and the Director of UNU-INWEH. The institute's operations and funding are mainly supported through agreements with the Government of Canada and its facilities are supported by a partnership with McMaster University.

Mission 

The UNU-INWEH's mission is to address international water scarcity and water resources management issues that affect the United Nations directly through its member states. The primary function of the institute is to help resolve international water challenges through research and education on issues such as management of water resources, promotion of ecosystem health and improving human wellbeing through safe water access.

Capacity Development 
The organization has a significant focus on promoting capacity development as both a research and an educational institute.

Water Without Borders Program 
The Water Without Borders Program is a graduate certificate program administered as a collaboration between the UNU-INWEH and McMaster University. It was initially developed in 2010 with the aim of promoting academic and professional development at the graduate level for students with an interest in global water issues. The course runs over a full academic year and includes course components such as course-based learning, a final paper on a water-related topic relevant to the UNU-INWEH as well as an international field trip to learn about global water challenges within a real-world context.

Internship Programs 
The UNU-INWEH also runs an in-house internship program for graduate students that have completed or are close to completing their formal degree program. Internships typically range from 3–6 months and have a focus on producing either a research paper, tool or dataset that contributes to the organization's broader role and mission. In 2018, five interns from three different countries were hosted through this program.

Online Learning 
The Water Learning Centre (WLC) is an online program that offers three courses: Integrated Water Resources Management, Mangroves Management and Global Water Security. The aim the WLC is to engage international trainees from with water management issues at a cohesive interface. The average time commitment is 3 hours/week. The course is structured on UN-Water's framework for global water issues and runs across 25 total hours of instructional time.

See also 

 United Nations University
 UN-Water

References 

Academic staff of United Nations University